Niger Vallis is a valley on Mars that appears to have been carved by water. It has been identified as an outflow channel. It merges with Dao Vallis which runs southwestward into Hellas Planitia from the volcanic Hadriacus Mons. Like Dao, it was formed around the Late Noachian and Early Hesperian Epochs. It is named after the Niger River in Africa.

Ice-rich mantle 
Much of the surface of Mars is covered by a thick smooth mantle that is thought to be a mixture of ice and dust.    This ice-rich mantle, a few yards thick, smooths the land, but in places it has a bumpy texture, resembling the surface of a basketball. Because there are few craters on this mantle, the mantle is relatively young.  An image below shows a good view of this smooth mantle around Niger Vallis, as observed with HiRISE.

Changes in Mars's orbit and tilt cause significant changes in the distribution of water ice from polar regions down to latitudes equivalent to Texas.  During certain climate periods water vapor leaves polar ice and enters the atmosphere. The water comes back to ground at lower latitudes as deposits of frost or snow mixed generously with dust. The atmosphere of Mars contains a great deal of fine dust particles.  Water vapor will condense on the particles, then fall down to the ground due to the additional weight of the water coating.  When ice at the top of the mantling layer goes back into the atmosphere, it leaves behind dust, which insulates the remaining ice.

Notes

External links
 Google Mars map centred on Niger Vallis.

Valleys and canyons on Mars
Hellas quadrangle